Joe Reynolds may refer to:
Joe Reynolds (rugby union), New Zealand rugby union player
Joe Reynolds (baseball), American baseball player
Jo Reynolds, fictional character in the American television series Melrose Place

See also
Joey Reynolds, American radio show host and disc jockey
Joel Reynolds (born 1984), Australian rules footballer
Joel Reynolds (EastEnders), fictional character in British soap opera East Enders
Joseph Reynolds (disambiguation)